The Sabaot are one of the nine sub-tribes of the Kalenjin of Kenya and Uganda. The Sabaot in turn are divided into six communities largely identified by their dialects. These dialects of the Sabaot language are the Pok, Somek, Mosop, Kony, Bong'omek and Sabiny (Sebei). Being resident around Mount Elgon, the original homeland of most Kalenjin, the Sabaot are seen as the keepers of the authentic Kalenjin tradition. They and the area they inhabit are often referred to as Kapkugo (meaning grandparents/ancestors place) by other Kalenjin.

Origins
Tha Sabaot were among the Southern Nilotic speaking communities, i.e. proto-Kalenjin, who moved into the western highlands and Rift Valley region of Kenya around 700 BC. Their homelands lay somewhere near the common border between Sudan, Uganda, Kenya and Ethiopia . Their arrival in Kenya occurred shortly before the introduction of iron to East Africa. Contemporary studies, supported by a number of historical narratives from the various Kalenjin sub-tribes point to Tulwetab/Tuluop Kony (Mount Elgon) as their original point of settlement in Kenya.

Settlement

Oral tradition

The traditional account states that most Sabaot once lived at a place called Sengwer which is near the Cherangani Hills. The patriarch of the Sabaot community is said to have been a man called Kingo who moved to Kony from Sengwer. It is said that Kingo had four sons; Chebok, Chepkony, Chesabiny and Chebong’Om. These sons or one of them at least once broke a gourd belonging to their father and Kingo being very mad banished them from their home. The four sons dispersed, some to  Bungoma and others to areas further south and west. Wherever each of these sons went, they established a clan and at a later date these clans returned becoming the main clans of the Sabaot community.

Traditional life

Initiation
Like other Kalenjin and a number of East African societies,  the Sabaot traditionally practiced male and female circumcision. Male circumcision was meant to enhance cleanliness and bravery while female circumcision was practiced to reduce promiscuity.

Economic activities
In previous times, the Sabaot had vast lands which allowed for a pastoral lifestyle. With decreasing land size, the Sabaot have been forced to drastically change their lifestyle from cattle herding to planting maize (corn) and vegetables.

Culture
The principal reference points in the Sabaot identity have been land and cattle both of which are coming under increasing threat, from growing land shortages and decreasing pastoralism respectively, which along with a decline in the practice of certain traditional customs such as initiation and polygamy have led to a sense among the Sabaot that their identity is under threat.

Notable people
Jonson Authur Sakaja, Politician,Governor Nairobi county
 Fred Kapondi, politician and a member of parliament, Mt. Elgon Constituency.
 Dr. Robert Pukose, Medical Doctor & politician, a member of parliament, Endebess Constituency
William Chemonges, Politician,MP. Kween, Uganda
Rose Emma Cherukut, Politician,Woman MP. Kween District, Uganda
Abdi Fadhil Kisos Chemaswet, Politician, MP. Soi County, Uganda
Reuben Paul Chelimo, Politician, MP. Kongasis, Uganda
Solomon Malinga Chelangat, Politician, MP. Too, Uganda
Everlyn Chemutai, Politician,Woman MP. Bukwo District, Uganda
Twalla Fadhil, Politician, MP. Tingey, Uganda
Sam Cheptoris Mangusho, Politician, MP. Kapchorwa Municipality, Uganda
Phyllis Chemutai, Politician,Woman MP. Kapchorwa District, Uganda
 Moses Masai, Olympian, 5000 and 10000m champion
 Linet Masai, Olympian, 10000m champion 
 Milcah Chemos Cheywa, World Champion 3000m Steeplechase
 Joshua Cheptegei Olympian, 10000m runner
 Ben Jipcho 1972 Olympic silver medalist
 Cellphine Chesipol, athlete
 Mercy Moim, Volleyball
 Allan Chesang, Senator, Tranzoia County
 Lilian Siyoi, Woman Representative, Tranzoia County
 Philomena Kapkory, Deputy Governor, Tranzoia County
 Janepher Mbatiany, Deputy Governor, Bungoma County
.

References

Kalenjin
Tribes of Africa